Sagauli Junction railway station is a junction railway station in East Champaran district, Bihar. Its code is SGL. It is on the Delhi–Muzaffarpur–Gorakhpur main line

Sagauli is connected to several cities in Bihar with daily passenger trains. There are multiple daily connections to Muzaffarpur, Raxaul, and Sitamarhi and daily connections to Bagaha, Bettiah, Hajipur, Samastipur, Motihari and Narkatiaganj.

Daily express trains connect to Delhi with stops in major cities in Uttar Pradesh including Gorakhpur and Bareilly. Kolkata is also connected by a daily express train.

There are also direct trains to Lucknow and Varanasi with stops in several towns in Uttar Pradesh. Chhapra, Patna, Jabalpur, Mumbai, Darbhanga, Barauni, Dhanbad, Bokaro, Ranchi, Rourkela, Bilaspur, Raipur and Nagpur are also connected by weekly or multiple weekly trains.

Delhi is connected via Satyagrah Express and Sadbhawna Express. Earlier, all tracks were metre gauge but most have been converted to  broad gauge. After the completion of the gauge conversion from Darbhanga to Sagauli via Sitamarhi, another broad-gauge route to Sagauli became available from March 2014.

Trains 
Samastipur is the divisional headquarters; several local passenger trains and express trains run from Sagauli to neighbouring destinations. List of some important trains that stop at Sagauli:Departures from SGL/Sagauli Junction.

Connectivity 
There are total 49 trains available, Train Departures ECR/East Central Zone – Railway Enquiry.which connect to some major cities of India viz., Amritsar, Bihar (Darbhanga, Katihar, Muzaffarpur, Narkatiaganj, Patliputra, Raxaul & Saharsa), Dehradun, Delhi (Anand Vihar), Guwahati, Gujarat (Ahmedabad & Porbandar), Howrah (Kolkata), Jaipur, Jammu, Mumbai (Bandra & LTT) and Uttar Pradesh (Bareilly, Kanpur, Lucknow & Manduadih).

References 

Railway stations in East Champaran district
Samastipur railway division